Lego Minecraft is a Lego theme based on the sandbox video game Minecraft. The theme was first introduced in 2012.

Overview
The earlier "Micro World" sets feature a group of four interlocking scenes that can be rearranged, with two having a removable surface with caves containing ores, underground rivers, and a minecart track, it also includes characters (referred to by Lego as Micromobs) which can be moved around like normal Lego.

The later sets feature brick-built locations with simple pieces (in order to remain faithful to Minecraft's blocky aesthetics), often on base plates raised by bricks, to allow for inter-connectivity with other sets. These sets are all of a minifigure scale, with custom moulds for the character heads, tools and certain body parts (for example the Creeper, which consists of primarily a single moulded piece for its torso and legs).

In October 2022, The Lego Group and Minecraft had launched a new Shuffle music project in YouTube.

Development

Microworlds
When asked about Lego Minecraft's beginnings, Mojang chief executive officer Carl Manneh stated that "it was one of the first things we talked about when we started Mojang." Mojang started the project on the Lego Cuusoo program, which required ten thousand signatures for the project to be approved. With the strong support of the Minecraft community, the signature objective was achieved within 2 days, and the development of the Lego Minecraft set commenced after Lego reviewed the project. The first Micro-World set was released on June 6, 2012. Portions of the sales proceeds went to a charity of Lego's choosing. On July 17, 2013, it was announced that two additional Micro-World sets would be added to the Minecraft theme based on the "Nether" and "Village" areas of the game. They were first shown at San Diego Comic-Con and released September 1, 2013. The fourth and final Micro-World set exploring "The End" region was released in summer 2014.

Minifigures
Minifigure sized Lego sets were then later announced in 2014. The prototypes of Creepers, mine carts, and sheep were all being developed as part of a Co-Build Project announced after MineCon, a fan convention. The initial group of 6 minifigre-scaled sets including the First Night, the Mine, the Ender Dragon, Crafting Box, the Farm and the Cave were released from November to December 2014. As of now, there are 43 Minifig-Scale that have been released with more on the way.

Bigfigs
In 2019, Lego introduced Minecraft Bigfigs which are Big brick built figures based on Minecraft mobs similar to Lego Construction figures like Bionicle, Knights Kingdom II, etc. So far there have been three Bigfigs released consisting of Bigfig Steve with Parrot, Bigfig Alex with Chicken, and Bigfig Skeleton with Magma Cube with a Series 2 to be released in 2020.

Toy line

Construction sets

According to Bricklink, The Lego Group released 106 playsets and promotional polybags as part of the Lego Minecraft theme.

Lego Ideas sets
In 2012, Minecraft Micro World (set number: 21102) was released on 1 June 2012 as a part Lego Ideas theme and based on the video game Minecraft. First set to start a new Lego Minecraft theme.

Lego BrickHeadz sets
Steve & Creeper (set number: 41612) was released in August 2018 as part of the Lego BrickHeadz theme and based on the Minecraft video game. The set consists of 160 pieces and 2 baseplates.

In March 2023, Alex (set number: 40624), Llama (set number: 40625) and Zombie (set number: 40626) were be released on 1 April 2023.

Reception
Mashable listed the first Lego Minecraft set as a creative gift for the 2012 Christmas season. Forbes magazine noted in December 2012 that the original set was sold out due to its great popularity.

In 2020, The Crafting Box 3.0 (set number: 21161) was listed in the "LEGO Christmas 2020 gift list for gamers" by Lego fansite Brick Fanatics.

Awards and nominations
In 2015, The Nether Fortress (set number: 21122) was awarded "DreamToys" in the Build It And They Will Thrive category by the Toy Retailers Association.

In 2022, The Mushroom House (set number: 21179) was awarded "DreamToys" in the Video Game Inspired category by the Toy Retailers Association.

See also
Lego Overwatch
Lego The Angry Birds Movie
Lego Super Mario
Lego BrickHeadz

References

External links

Minecraft
Minecraft
Products introduced in 2012
Minecraft